Ellie Hampson (born 8 February 2001) is an Australian rules footballer playing for  in the AFL Women's competition (AFLW).

Early life
Hampson grew up in Townsville and attended William Ross State High School. She grew up playing soccer and was considered an outstanding prospect. At the age of 15, she began playing Australian rules football for the Hermit Park Football Club and was a junior state representative in both sports but decided to focus on the latter due to better junior pathways. She was one of the Gold Coast Suns' three inaugural signings for the women's list and her acquisition was announced on her 18th birthday. She relocated to the Gold Coast for the 2019 season and began playing QAFLW football for Coorparoo. She would go on to play part in Coorparoo's 2019 QAFLW premiership and was named an Under 18  All-Australian as well as Queensland's MVP at the 2019 AFL Women's Under 18 Championships. In 2020, Hampson switched QAFLW clubs and began playing for the Bond University Bull Sharks.

AFLW career
Hampson made her AFLW debut against Richmond in round 2 of the 2020 AFL Women's season.

Statistics 
Statistics are correct to the end of the 2020 season.

|- style="background-color:#EAEAEA"
! scope="row" style="text-align:center" | 2020
| 
| 21 || 6 || 0 || 0 || 29 ||  27 || 56 || 7 || 21 || 0.0 || 0.0 || 4.8 || 4.5 || 9.3 || 1.2 || 3.5 || 
|- class="sortbottom"
! colspan=3 | Career
! 6  
! 0
! 0
! 29
! 27 
! 56
! 7
! 21
! 0.0
! 0.0
! 4.8 
! 4.5 
! 9.3
! 1.2 
! 3.5
! 
|}

References

External links 

2001 births
Living people
Australian people of Canadian descent
Sportswomen from Queensland
Australian rules footballers from Queensland
Gold Coast Football Club (AFLW) players
21st-century Australian women